Karagözler can refer to:

 Karagözler, Güney
 Karagözler, İncirliova